Paruvu-Prathishta is a 1963 Indian Telugu-language drama film, produced by Jupudi Venkateswara Rao and directed by Manapuram Appa Rao. It stars N. T. Rama Rao and Anjali Devi, with music composed by Pendyala Nageswara Rao.

Plot 
Raghu, an intelligent guy from a wealthy family. He falls in love with a beautiful good-natured girl Susheela who is a needy in her maternal uncle Paramdamaiah's house and his wife Durgamma. Thereafter, Susheela joins in a job where Narendra, her co-employee tries to molest her when she handover him to the police and he is sentenced. Due to her delay, Durgamma chides her out of the house. Seeing Susheela homeless, Rao Bahadoor Prakasham and his wife Parvathi shelters her where she is surprised to see Raghu as their son. Raghu convinces her and marries her in the temple, secretly. After the marriage, Raghu leaves for abroad for higher studies when Susheela becomes pregnant and everyone suspects her chastity. At the same time, Narendra, released from jail who makes Prakasam and his family believe that Susheela is his wife, so, he sends her along with him but somehow escapes. Meanwhile, Raghu returns from abroad and reveals the truth to his parents. By the time, Susheela gives birth to a son, she leaves the newborn baby under the guardianship of Raghu's friend Venkat and his wife Dr. Karuna's. After that, she tries to kill herself when Shantamma, a social reformer who runs an orphanage rescues her. Susheela starts living with them, Narendra reaches there too when Shantamma's brother Ranga saves her. Years roll by, as Venu son of Raghu and Susheela becomes an advocate. On the other side, Raghu is still in search of Susheela, at last, he finds her, explains her everything and they are reunited. Unfortunately, Narendra again arrives, attacks them, in the quarrel Ranga kills Narendra by throwing the knife from behind and the blame comes on Susheela. Venu prosecutes the case and Raghu defends, at that time, Venu discovers that Susheela is his mother, but he is helpless, Susheela joins father and son and prepares for punishment. At the last minute, Ranga accepts his crime and surrenders himself; Susheela is acquitted.

Cast 

 N. T. Rama Rao as Raghu
 Anjali Devi as Susheela
 Relangi as Venkat
 Rajanala as Narendra
 Gummadi Rao Bahadoor Prakasam
 Satyanarayana as Ranga
 Chalam as Venu
 Mikkilineni as Parandhamaiah
 Raja Babu
 Amarnath as Judge
 Kakarala
 Jagga Rao
 Kannamba as Parvathi
 Suryakantham as Durgamma
 Chayadevi as Shanthamma
 Girija as Dr. Karuna

Soundtrack 

Music was composed by Pendyala Nageswara Rao.

References

External links 
 

1960s Telugu-language films
Films scored by Pendyala Nageswara Rao
Indian drama films